Ucalegon was one of the Elders of Troy, whose house was set afire by the Achaeans when they sacked the city. He is one of Priam's friends in the Iliad, and the destruction of his house is referred to in the Aeneid.

He is referenced in the Satires of Juvenal. His name in Greek is translated as "doesn't worry." The name has become an eponym for "neighbor whose house is on fire," and Will Shortz, editor of The New York Times crossword puzzle, has stated that it's his favorite word in the English language.

Usage in literature

Namesake
 55701 Ukalegon

External links

Iliad Study Guide: Character list
Iam proximus ardet Ucalegon on the Italian Wikipedia

References 

Characters in the Aeneid
Trojans